Austin William Lewis (26 May 1870 – 19 September 1937) was an Australian rules footballer who played for the Melbourne Football Club in the VFA and Victorian Football League (VFL). He played in the 1900 premiership under the captaincy of Dick Wardill.

Football
Lewis made his VFL debut against  in Round 1 of the 1897 VFL season at the Lake Oval, having played 113 matches (eight for Richmond and 105 for Melbourne) in the VFA. He has been given the Melbourne Heritage Number of 7 based on the order of his VFL/AFL debut for the club.

Lewis retired in 1903 after 87 VFL games, for a career total of exactly 200. His 192 games for Melbourne included the club's 1900 Grand Final win, and was the club record until it was broken by Percy Beames in Round 14, 1943.

Notes

References
 'Follower', "The Footballers' Alphabet", The Leader, (Saturday, 23 July 1898), p.17.

External links

 
 

}

1870 births
1937 deaths
Melbourne Football Club players
Australian rules footballers from Victoria (Australia)
Melbourne Football Club (VFA) players
Richmond Football Club (VFA) players
Melbourne Football Club Premiership players
One-time VFL/AFL Premiership players